Chibuikem Kenneth Okoro (born October 18, 1989) is an American football cornerback who is currently a free agent. He played college football at Wake Forest University and attended James B. Dudley High School in Greensboro, North Carolina. He has been a member of the San Diego Chargers, San Jose SaberCats and Washington Redskins. His name Chibuikem means "God is my power" in Igbo

Early years
Okoro's parents are both Nigerian immigrants. He played high school football for the James B. Dudley High School Panthers. He was the Greensboro News and Record All-Area Player of the Year as a senior and a member of the NCPreps.com 3A All-State team. Okoro was an honor roll student all four years of high school.

College career
Okoro played for the Wake Forest Demon Deacons from 2009 to 2012. He was redshirted in 2008. He started 37 games for the Demon Deacons, recording seven interceptions.

Professional career

San Diego Chargers
Okoro was signed by the San Diego Chargers on April 27, 2013 after going undrafted in the 2013 NFL Draft. He was waived-injured by the Chargers on July 30, 2013.

San Jose SaberCats
Okoro spent the 2014 Arena Football League season with the San Jose SaberCats. He recorded 60 tackles and an interception in 11 games with the SaberCats. He was placed on Other League Exempt on December 2, 2014.

Washington Redskins
Okoro was signed to the Washington Redskins' practice squad on November 26, 2014. He was promoted to the active roster on December 6. He made his NFL debut on December 7, 2014 against the St. Louis Rams.

On May 4, 2015, he was waived by the Redskins.

San Jose SaberCats
Okoro was activated from Other League Exempt on May 6, 2015. The Sabercats won ArenaBowl XXVIII against the Jacksonville Sharks on August 29, 2015. He became a free agent after the 2015 season.

References

External links
Wake Forest Demon Deacons bio
Just Sports Stats
College stats
NFL Draft Scout
San Jose SaberCats bio

Living people
1989 births
Players of American football from Greensboro, North Carolina
American football defensive backs
Nigerian players of American football
American sportspeople of Nigerian descent
Wake Forest Demon Deacons football players
San Jose SaberCats players
Washington Redskins players